Reza Nouri (born in 1973, Bojnourd) is the newly appointed representative of Vali-e-Faqih (Guardianship of the Islamic Jurist) in North-Khorasan Province and is also the Friday prayer leader (Imam-Jom'eh) of Bojnourd. This Iranian Shiite cleric was the temporary Friday-Imam of the city of Bojnourd before being appointed as the main/permanent Imam-Jom'eh of the city.

Life 
This Twelver Shia cleric who is also known/called "Hujjatul-Islam Nouri" was born in 1973 in the village of Naveh around the city of Bojnourd, located in the northeastern of Iran. After finishing his education, Nouri began teaching in the seminary (Hawzah) of Bojnourd in 2001. This representative of Vali-e-Faqih participated in the Iran-Iraq war and served there in the Nasrallah Battalion.

Appointment 
Reza Nouri was appointed as the representative of Vali-e-Faqih in North Khorasan Province and as the Imam Jom'eh of Bojnourd city (instead of Abul Qasem Ya'qoubi) on December 9, 2016 by the decree of Seyyed Ali Khamenei, the Supreme Leader of the Islamic Republic of Iran.

See also 
 List of provincial representatives appointed by Supreme Leader of Iran
 Sayyid Ahmad Alamolhoda (Representative of the Supreme Leader in Khorasan Razavi)

References

Iranian Islamists
Living people
People from Bojnord
Iranian Shia clerics
Iranian politicians
Representatives of the Supreme Leader in the Provinces of Iran
1973 births